Sagenidiopsis is a genus of lichens in the family Arthoniaceae. It was circumscribed in 1987 by lichenologists Roderick Rogers and Josef Hafellner to contain the type species S. merrotsii, found in Australia. The characteristic features of the genus include the byssoid (cottony) thallus and bitunicate asci (enclosed in a double wall) that lack amyloid structures that are apparent in the thallus.

References

Roccellaceae
Ascomycota genera
Lichen genera
Taxa described in 1987
Taxa named by Josef Hafellner